From Satellite is an alternative rock band from Ventura, California. They have gained most of their recognition from touring with Hoobastank and Alien Ant Farm. Also, some of their music was featured in the soundtrack for the video game ESPN NHL 2K5.

Members
 Ian McDonnell - vocals
 Armand Tambouris - guitar
 Ryan Cleary - guitar
 Justin Huth - bass
 Pat Pedraza - drums

Albums
 When All Is Said and Done (2004)

References

External links
 

Alternative rock groups from California